HMS Sherwood is a Royal Naval Reserve shore establishment in Nottinghamshire, England.  The first naval reserve unit was established in Nottingham in 1949.  It was commissioned as Sherwood in 1984, at which time the unit was based at Chalfont Drive, Beechdale.  A Royal Marines Reserve detachment was added to the unit in 2007.  In 2014 HMS Sherwood moved to Chetwynd Barracks, Chilwell, where it was co-located with an Army Reserve unit.  Sherwood was honoured by receiving the freedom of the city of Nottingham in 2018.

Previous units 
The establishment shares its name with HMS Sherwood, the former USS Rodgers, a  transferred from the US Navy to the Royal Navy as part of the destroyers-for-bases deal in 1940.  During the Second World War Sherwood served on convoy escort duty, in the hunt for the German cruiser Admiral Scheer following the attack on convoy HX 84 and in the hunt for the battleship Bismarck.  She was scrapped in 1945.  The first naval reserve unit in Nottingham, a signals unit, was established in 1949 in the city centre; the unit relocated to Carrington Street in 1961.

Chalfont Drive 
The Nottingham Royal Naval Reserve unit moved to Chalfont Drive, Beechdale, (also the site of a Civil Defence regional seat of government) in 1984 and was commissioned as HMS Sherwood.  Elements of Sherwood were mobilised to serve on active duty in Operation Herrick (Afghanistan 2002–2014) and Operation Telic (Iraq 2003–2011).  Members also served during the 2012 Olympic Games in London and with British Forces Gibraltar.  In 2007 a Royal Marines Reserve detachment was formed at Sherwood.  The Chalfont Road site was identified as one of three Royal Naval Reserve (RNR) sites surplus to requirements in 2013.

Chetwynd Barracks 
HMS Sherwood relocated to Foresters House, Chilwell (part of Chetwynd Barracks) in 2014.   The barracks was one identified, in 2016, for closure by 2020.  In 2019 the proposals were put on hold until 2024.

It is co-located, as a Reserve Training Centre, with a unit of the Army Reserve (a squadron of the 101 (City of London) Engineer Regiment). In May 2018 HMS Sherwood was awarded the freedom of the city of Nottingham, becoming only the seventh RNR unit to receive such an honour. To mark the honour the unit marched through the city in the traditional manner with drums beating, colours flying, and bayonets fixed on 2 June 2018. They were accompanied by members of the Sea Cadets and veterans of the unit and its ship namesake. On the same day a Nottingham City Transport bus was renamed "HMS Sherwood", at the suggestion of a member of the unit who worked in the company's operations centre.

References 

 

Royal Navy bases in England
Royal Navy shore establishments
Buildings and structures in Nottinghamshire
1984 establishments in England
Military installations established in 1984
Military history of Nottinghamshire